The 1868 United States presidential election was the 21st quadrennial presidential election, held on Tuesday, November 3, 1868. In the first election of the Reconstruction Era, Republican nominee Ulysses S. Grant defeated Horatio Seymour of the Democratic Party. It was the first presidential election to take place after the conclusion of the American Civil War and the abolition of slavery. It was the first election in which African Americans could vote in the reconstructed Southern states, in accordance with the First Reconstruction Act.

Incumbent president Andrew Johnson had succeeded to the presidency in 1865 following the assassination of Abraham Lincoln, a Republican. Johnson, a War Democrat from Tennessee, had served as Lincoln's running mate in 1864 on the National Union ticket, which was designed to attract Republicans and War Democrats. Upon accession to office, Johnson clashed with the Republican Congress over Reconstruction policies and was impeached and nearly removed from office. Johnson received some support for another term at the 1868 Democratic National Convention, but, after several ballots, the convention nominated Seymour, who had formerly served as Governor of New York. The 1868 Republican National Convention unanimously nominated Grant, who had been the highest-ranking Union general at the end of the Civil War. The Democrats criticized the Republican Reconstruction policies, and "campaigned explicitly on an anti-black, pro-white platform," while Republicans campaigned on Grant's popularity and the Union victory in the Civil War.

Grant decisively won the electoral vote, but his margin was narrower in the popular vote. In addition to his appeal in the North, Grant benefited from votes among the newly enfranchised freedmen in the South, while the temporary political disfranchisement of many Southern whites helped Republican margins. As three of the former Confederate states (Texas, Mississippi, and Virginia) were not yet restored to the Union, their electors could not vote in the election. This was the last time that Missouri supported the Republican candidate until 1904.

Background
In the wake of the Civil War, the civil rights of former slaves was a hotly debated issue in the Union. Grant supported the Reconstruction plans of the Radical Republicans in Congress, which favored the 14th Amendment, with full citizenship and civil rights for freedmen, including suffrage (the right to vote) for former slaves. The Democratic platform denigrated such rights as "Negro supremacy," and demanded a restoration of states' rights, including the right of southern states to determine for themselves whether to allow suffrage for adult freedmen. The former Confederate States were determined to limit the civil rights of emancipated slaves, and supported the Democratic candidate.

Nominations

Republican Party nomination

By 1868, the Republicans felt strong enough to drop the Union Party label, but wanted to nominate a popular hero for their presidential candidate. General Ulysses S. Grant announced he was a Republican and was unanimously nominated on the first ballot as the party's standard-bearer at the Republican convention in Chicago, held on May 20–21, 1868. House Speaker Schuyler Colfax, a Radical Republican from Indiana, was nominated for vice president on the sixth ballot, beating out early favorite, Senator Benjamin Wade of Ohio.

The Republican platform supported black suffrage as part of 14th Amendment's promise of full citizenship for former slaves. It opposed using greenbacks to redeem U.S. bonds, encouraged immigration, endorsed full rights for naturalized citizens, and favored Radical Reconstruction as distinct from the more lenient policies of President Andrew Johnson.

Democratic Party nomination

The Democratic National Convention was held in New York City on July 4–9, 1868. The front-runner in the early balloting was George H. Pendleton (1864 Democratic vice presidential nominee), who led on the first 15 ballots, followed in varying order by President Johnson, Winfield Scott Hancock, Sanford Church, Asa Packer, Joel Parker, James E. English, James Rood Doolittle, and Thomas A. Hendricks. The unpopular Johnson, having narrowly survived impeachment, won 65 votes on the first ballot, less than one-third of the total necessary for nomination, and thus lost his bid for election as president in his own right.

Meanwhile, the convention chairman Horatio Seymour, former governor of New York, received nine votes on the fourth ballot from the state of North Carolina. This unexpected move caused "loud and enthusiastic cheering," but Seymour refused, saying,

By the seventh ballot Pendleton and Hendricks had emerged as the two front-runners, with Hancock the only other candidate with much support by this point. After numerous indecisive ballots, the names of John T. Hoffman, Francis P. Blair, and Stephen Johnson Field were placed in nomination, but none of these candidates gained substantial support.

For 21 ballots, the opposing candidates battled it out: the East battling the West for control, the conservatives battling the radicals. Pendleton's support collapsed after the 15th ballot, but went to Hancock rather than Hendricks, leaving the convention still deadlocked. The two leading candidates were determined that the other should not receive the presidential nomination; because of the two-thirds rule of the convention, a compromise candidate was needed. Seymour still hoped it would be Chief Justice Salmon P. Chase, but on the 22nd ballot, the chairman of the Ohio delegation announced, "at the unanimous request and demand of the delegation I place Horatio Seymour in nomination with 21 votes—against his inclination, but no longer against his honor."

Seymour had to wait for the rousing cheers to die down before he could address the delegates and decline.

"Take the nomination, then!" cried someone from the floor.

Seymour left the platform to cool off and rest. No sooner had he left the hall than the Ohio chairman cried that his delegation would not accept Seymour's declination; Utah's chairman rose to say that Seymour was the man they had to have. While Seymour was waiting in the vestibule, the convention nominated him for president unanimously.

Exhausted, the delegates unanimously nominated General Francis Preston Blair, Jr., for vice president on the first ballot after John A. McClernand, Augustus C. Dodge, and Thomas Ewing, Jr., withdrew their names from consideration. Blair's nomination reflected a desire to balance the ticket east and west as well as north and south.

Blair had worked hard for the Democratic vice presidential nomination and accepted second place on the ticket, finding himself in controversy. He had gained attention for an inflammatory letter addressed to Colonel James O. Broadhead, dated a few days before the convention met, in which he wrote that the "real and only issue in this contest was the overthrow of Reconstruction, as the radical Republicans had forced it in the South."

General election

Campaign 

The 1868 campaign of Horatio Seymour versus Ulysses S. Grant was conducted vigorously, being fought out largely on the question of how Reconstruction should be conducted.
 Seymour's campaign was marked by pronounced appeals to racism with repeated attempts to brand General Grant as the "Nigger" candidate and Seymour as the "White Man's" candidate.[6] Grant's antisemitic General Order No. 11 during the Civil War became a campaign issue. This phenomenon is represented in a powerful cartoon by Bernhard Gillam. In the comic, Grant is depicted in crocodile skin and crying tears that fall onto the  words "Jewish vote 1884." Additionally, he is sitting in front of a bill on the wall stating, "Order No. 11 by U.S. Grant, 1862, excluding Jews from the army." Gillam comments on this and writes at the bottom of the cartoon, "Oh, now you weep, and I perceive you feel the dint of pity. These are Gracious Drops." 

He apologized in a letter for the controversial order, stating "I have no prejudice against sect or race, but want each individual to be judged by his own merit. Order No. 11 does not sustain this statement, I admit, but then I do not sustain that order. It would never have been issued if it had not been telegraphed the moment it was penned and without reflection." In his army days he had traded at a local store operated by the Seligman brothers, two Jewish merchants who became Grant's lifelong friends. They became wealthy bankers who donated substantially to Grant's presidential campaign.

Grant took no part in the campaign and made no promises. The Republican campaign theme, "Let us have peace," was taken from his letter of acceptance. After four years of civil war, three years of wrangling over Reconstruction, and the attempted impeachment of a president, the nation craved the peace Grant pledged to achieve.

Seymour answered none of the charges made against him, but made a few key speeches. Some newspapers exaggerated his faults. As governor, Seymour had sent troops to Gettysburg, but some press tried to portray him as disloyal to the Union. The New York Tribune led the cartoon campaign with the picture of Seymour standing on the steps of the City Hall calling a mob of New York draft rioters "my friends." The Hartford Post called him "almost as much of a corpse" as ex-President James Buchanan, who had just died. Additionally, Republicans alleged that insanity ran through the Seymour family, citing as evidence the suicide of his father.

Blair went on a national speaking tour in which he framed the contest with Ulysses S. Grant and the pro-Reconstruction Republicans in stark racial terms, warning of the rule of "a semi-barbarous race of blacks who are worshipers of fetishes and poligamists" and wanted to "subject the white women to their unbridled lust." Republicans advised Americans not to vote for Seymour, as Blair might succeed him.

Blair had a reputation for outspokenness and his campaign speeches in 1868 attacked Radical Republicans. Samuel J. Tilden, a member of the national committee, asked Blair to confine his campaigning to Missouri and Illinois for fear he "would hurt the ticket" because of his stance on Reconstruction.

Seymour, who had not taken an active role in the campaign to this point, went into the canvass, seeking to steer the campaign away from the harshness of Blair's attacks on Radical Reconstruction. Seymour emphasized his idea that change in the South should be accomplished at the state level, without national interference. The Democrats campaigned for immediate restoration of all states, the "regulation of the elective franchise in the states by their citizens", and amnesty for past political offenses, while State civil authority should take precedence over military action. The president and the Supreme Court should be respected rather than attacked, as he claimed the Republicans had done. The Democrats would be careful to reorder national priorities.

Results
Horatio Seymour polled 2,708,744 votes and Grant 3,013,650.

The closeness of the popular vote surprised the political elite at the time. Republican Representative James G. Blaine called the slender popular majority for Grant "a very startling fact." Blaine, an acute judge of popular sentiment, was at a loss to explain the size of the Democratic vote. Ethnic Irish Catholic and other immigrants had been settling in New York for nearly a quarter century. The narrow margins by which Seymour lost several of the northern states like Indiana, Connecticut, and Pennsylvania, and the effects of new black votes in the South provoked the suspicion that a majority of white men voted for Seymour.

Democrats did not fare well in most of the South, where newly freed African Americans voted in large numbers for Grant. Republicans carried every southern state except Georgia and Louisiana, where Ku Klux Klan and Knights of the White Camelia violence and fraud gave Democrats majorities.

Along the border, Kentucky, Maryland, and Delaware went overwhelmingly Democratic, in Kentucky's case influenced by hostility toward the Radical Reconstructionists, which had led to the state's first postwar government being almost entirely composed of former Confederates. No Democratic presidential candidate before or since has attained a higher percentage of the vote in Kentucky or Maryland, where hostility toward black suffrage was very widespread. As for Delaware, only the Democratic tickets of Johnson/Humphrey in 1964 (which was elected with the largest percentage of the popular vote since 1824) and Obama/Biden in 2008 (which had the first Delawarean on a national ticket) carried the state with a larger percentage of the vote.

Two border states, Missouri and West Virginia, both under Republican control, gave their electoral votes to Grant. Seymour narrowly carried his home state of New York, but Blair, largely because of the Radicals' registry system, failed to carry Missouri. The Missouri Democrat exulted: "General Blair is beaten in his ward, his city, his county and his State." In West Virginia, former Confederates were temporarily forbidden from voting or holding public office. About 15,000 to 25,000 white residents were disfranchised as a result.

Of the 1,708 counties making returns, Grant won 991 (58.02%) and Seymour 713 (41.74%). Four counties (0.23%) split evenly between Grant and Seymour. Hence the Democrats, even with all the burdens of the war, still carried only 278 fewer counties than the Republicans. That cemented a solid party comeback at the grassroots level that had begun in local elections in 1867.

The 1868 election is the only election since the Civil War in which the two major party candidates won over 99.9% of the vote. Out of a total of over 5.7 million votes, just 46 ballots were cast for anyone other than Grant and Seymour.

That was the last election in which the Republicans won Tennessee until 1920, the last in which the Democrats won Oregon until 1912, and the last in which the Republicans won Missouri until 1904.

That Grant lost New York to Seymour by 10,000 votes was a source of shame and anger to Republicans. Seymour's victory in New York was made the subject of a federal investigation. On November 4, Horace Greeley spoke at the Union League Club. The ULC promptly petitioned Congress to look into the state vote. The petition was presented to the House of Representatives on December 14 and accepted by a vote of 134-35 (52 abstained). Speaker of the House Schuyler Colfax, the Republican candidate for vice president, appointed a committee of seven: five Republicans and two Democrats. The committee was most likely created because the Republicans could not lose New York without a protest. It reported to the House of Representatives on February 23, 1869. The committee decided to take no action, and Seymour retained New York's 33 electoral votes. He was willing to return to the subject as long as he lived.

According to Seymour's biographer, Stewart Mitchell, the Republican Party claimed credit for saving the Union and was bound, bent, and determined to continue to rule it. The margin of Grant's popular majority resulted largely from winning a high percentage of the half-million newly enfranchised men or color. This strategy contrasted strongly with later years, when Republicans could not stop black disfranchisement in the former Confederate states, since they had many new and secure votes in new states in the Western United States.

Source (Popular Vote): 
Source (Electoral Vote): 
(a) Mississippi, Texas, and Virginia did not participate in the election of 1868 due to Reconstruction. In Florida, the state legislature cast its electoral vote for Grant by a vote of 40 to 9.

Geography of results

Cartographic gallery

Results by state 
Source: Data from Walter Dean Burnham, Presidential ballots, 1836–1892 (Johns Hopkins University Press, 1955) pp 247–57.

Close states 
Red font color denotes states won by Republican Ulysses S. Grant; blue denotes those won by Democrat Horatio Seymour.

States where the margin of victory was under 1% (8 electoral votes)
California 0.48% (520 votes)
Oregon 0.74% (164 votes)

States where the margin of victory was under 5% (93 electoral votes)
New York 1.18% (9,995 votes)
New Jersey 1.76% (2,870 votes)
Alabama 2.50% (3,746 votes)
Indiana 2.79% (9,572 votes)
Connecticut 2.98% (2,944 votes)
Pennsylvania 4.41% (28,898 votes)

States where the margin of victory was under 10% (35 electoral votes)
North Carolina 6.82% (12,380 votes) (tipping point state for a Grant victory)
Arkansas 7.37% (3,034 votes) (tipping point state for a Seymour victory)
Ohio 8.01% (41,546 votes)

Statistics
Counties with highest percent of vote (Republican)
Hancock County, Tennessee 100.00%
Monona County, Iowa 100.00%
Ottawa County, Kansas 100.00%
Jefferson County, Nebraska 100.00%
McDowell County, West Virginia 100.00%

Counties with highest percent of vote (Democratic)
St. Landry Parish, Louisiana 100.00%
Lafayette Parish, Louisiana 100.00%
Jackson Parish, Louisiana 100.00%
De Soto Parish, Louisiana 100.00%
Franklin Parish, Louisiana 100.00%

Counties with highest percent of vote (Other)
DeKalb County, Alabama 0.70%
Sullivan County, New Hampshire 0.11%
Strafford County, New Hampshire 0.09%
Carroll County, New Hampshire 0.02%

See also
American election campaigns in the 19th century
First inauguration of Ulysses S. Grant
History of the United States (1865–1918)
History of the United States Democratic Party
History of the United States Republican Party
Reconstruction era
Third Party System
1868–1869 United States House of Representatives elections
1868–1869 United States Senate elections
Ohio idea

Footnotes

Notes

Bibliography
 American Annual Cyclopedia ... 1868 (1869), online, highly detailed compendium of facts and primary sources
 Coleman, Charles Hubert. The election of 1868 : the Democratic effort to regain control (1933) online
Gambill, Edward. Conservative Ordeal: Northern Democrats and Reconstruction, 1865-1868. (Iowa State University Press: 1981).

 Henry, Robert Selph. The Story of Reconstruction (1938)

 Prymak, Andrew. "The 1868 and 1872 Elections," in Edward O. Frantz, ed. A Companion to the Reconstruction Presidents 1865-1881 (Wiley Blackwell Companions to American History) (2014) pp 235–56 online
 Rhodes, James G. History of the United States from the Compromise of 1850 to the McKinley-Bryan Campaign of 1896. Volume: 6. (1920). 1865–72; detailed narrative history
 Simpson, Brooks D. Let Us Have Peace: Ulysses S. Grant and the Politics of War and Reconstruction, 1861-1868 (1991).
 Summers, Mark Wahlgren.The Press Gang: Newspapers and Politics, 1865-1878 (1994)
 Summers, Mark Wahlgren. The Era of Good Stealings (1993), covers corruption 1868-1877

Primary sources
 Chester, Edward W A guide to political platforms (1977) pp 86–89 online
 Official proceedings of the National Democratic convention, held at New York, July 4-9, 1868
 Edward McPherson.  The Political History of the United States of America During the Period of Reconstruction (1875) large collection of speeches and primary documents, 1865–1870, complete text online.[The copyright has expired.]

 Porter, Kirk H. and Donald Bruce Johnson, eds. National party platforms, 1840-1964 (1965) online 1840-1956

External links

Presidential Election of 1868: A Resource Guide from the Library of Congress
1868 popular vote by counties
1868 State-by-state Popular vote

 Election of 1868 in Counting the Votes 

 
Presidency of Ulysses S. Grant
Ulysses S. Grant
November 1868 events